Kak is a lake in Timiryazev District, North Kazakhstan Region, Kazakhstan.

The southern shore of the lake lies very close to the border with Kostanay Province.

Geography
Kak lies in a shallow depression to the west of the Ishim, in an area of scattered lakes at the southern limits of the West Siberian Plain. The lake is roughly oval, has very little depth and its bottom is flat. Its main food is snow and the level of the water is subject to seasonal changes, shrinking by 20 to 40% in years of drought.

The lake is also known was "Big Kak" in order to differentiate it from another lake located further to the east in the district.

Fauna
The vegetation in the area of lake Kak was formerly forest-steppe, but nowadays the lake is largely surrounded by agricultural fields. The lake is visited by large flocks of waterbirds and waders, such as the red-breasted goose, whooper swan and common crane, as well as by the white-tailed eagle. It is also one of the critical sites for the lesser white-fronted goose.

See also
List of lakes of Kazakhstan

References

External links
Ecological assessment of wetland ecosystems of northern Kazakhstan

Lakes of Kazakhstan
North Kazakhstan Region
West Siberian Plain